Liganga is a site in Njombe Region, Tanzania where iron ore is mined in Liganga mine. It is also rich in both vanadium and titanium.

The deposits are near Lake Malawi in the south of the country.

See also 

 Railway stations in Tanzania - proposed
 Liganga on Google Maps

References 

Geography of Njombe Region
Mining communities in Africa
Mining in Tanzania